Alfred Teall was a priest who worked as a missionary for the Anglican Church in Melanesia.

Teall was educated at Dorchester Missionary College and ordained in 1921. He was on Ambae Island from 1920 to 1928; and Banks Island from 1928 to 1935. He was Archdeacon of Southern Melanesia from 1935 to 1959.

References

Anglican missionaries in Vanuatu
20th-century Anglican priests
Alumni of Dorchester Missionary College
Archdeacons of Southern Melanesia
English Anglican missionaries